Neita orbipalus is a butterfly in the family Nymphalidae. It is found in Tanzania.

The upperside of the wings is brown to sooty brown. In both the forewings and hindwings there are a dark-brown marginal line, a brown submarginal line and a dark-brown thicker line inside this. Females are a little larger and paler than males.

Subspecies
Neita orbipalus orbipalus (Tanzania: north to the Arusha plain)
Neita orbipalus congdoni Kielland, 1990  (Tanzania: southern highlands)

References

Endemic fauna of Tanzania
Satyrini
Butterflies described in 1990